Cristești may refer to several places:

 Cristești, Botoșani, a commune in Botoșani County, Romania
 Cristești, Iași, a commune in Iași County, Romania
 Cristești, Mureș, a commune in Mureș County, Romania
 Cristești, a village in Mogoș Commune, Alba County, Romania
 Cristești, a village in Hălmagiu Commune, Arad County, Romania
 Cristești, a village in Brăești Commune, Iași County, Romania
 Cristești, a village in Holboca Commune, Iași County, Romania
 Cristești, a village in Puiești Commune, Vaslui County, Romania
 Cristești, Nisporeni, a commune in Nisporeni district, Moldova

See also 
 Cristea (surname)
 Cristescu (surname)
 Cristian (disambiguation)
 Cristinești, a commune in Botoşani County, Romania